Benjamin E. Mays High School is a public school located in southwest Atlanta, Georgia, United States, serving grades 9-12. It is a part of the Atlanta Public School System and is a Georgia School of Excellence. The school was established in the fall of 1981 and was named after Benjamin Elijah Mays, an educator, author and civil rights activist.

The school's athletic nickname is the Raiders.

History

Southwest High School (1950–1981)
The Atlanta Public Schools formed Southwest High School in 1950. The school was a landmark in the city of Atlanta for 36 years. In 1981, Benjamin E. Mays High School was formed, replacing Southwest High School.

Southwest High School athletics

State Championships

1973 GHSA State AA Football Champions
1973 GHSA Boys' State AA Basketball Champions
1974 GHSA Boys' State AA Basketball Champions
1979 GHSA Boys' State AAA Basketball Champions

Mays High School (1981–present)
The high school completed $32 million worth of renovations in January 2012.

Mays High School athletics

The Mays High School Raiders athletic teams compete in Region 6-AAAAAA of the Georgia High School Association.

Mays High offers a wide variety of athletic programs, including varsity girls' softball, varsity boys' track, varsity boys' soccer, varsity football, junior varsity football, freshman football, varsity boys' basketball, junior varsity boys' basketball, varsity girls' basketball, junior varsity girls' basketball, varsity basketball, junior varsity basketball, cheerleading, co-ed step team, varsity boys' swimming, varsity girls' volleyball, and varsity girls' swimming. All home varsity football games, as well as track events, are held at Lakewood Stadium.

State/Region Championships
2001 GHSA AAAA Boys' Track Champions
2003 GHSA AAAA Girls' Basketball Champions
2004 GHSA AAAA Boys' Basketball Champions
2005 GHSA AAAA Boys' Basketball Champions
2014 GHSA State AAAAA Football Runner-Up
2015 GHSA Region 6-AAAAA Football Runner-Up Champions
2016 GHSA Region 5-AAAAAA Football Champions
2017 GHSA Region 5-AAAAAA Football Champions 
2017 GHSA State AAAAAA Girls' Basketball Champions
2017 GHSA State AAAAAA Girls' Track and Field Champions
2019 GHSA Region 5-AAAAAA Football Champions
2021 GHSA Region 6-AAAA Football Runner-Up Champions

Notable alumni

Andre Dickens, 61st Mayor of Atlanta
Mesha Mainor, State Representative in the Georgia House of Representatives
 Tyrell Adams , NFL player
Tayari Jones, author
 Kelly Campbell , former football player for Georgia Tech and several NFL and CFL teams
 Xzavion Curry, Major League Baseball pitcher
 Shanti Das, music industry executive, marketing consultant, entrepreneur, philanthropist, and author
 De'Mon Glanton , football player
 Kwanza Hall , politician
 Termarr Johnson, 2022 MLB 4th overall draft pick
 Walter Kimbrough, president of Dillard University
 Bryan McClendon , football coach and former player for Georgia
 Ceasar Mitchell, former president of the Atlanta City Council
 Adrienne C. Moore , actress
 Natrez Patrick , linebacker for the Denver Broncos of the NFL
 Diallo Riddle, writer, producer, and actor
 Fatima Cody Stanford, an Associate Professor at Harvard University and an obesity physician-scientist at Massachusetts General Hospital
 Rozonda Thomas, R&B singer of the group TLC and actress
 Reggie Wilkes, former Georgia Tech and NFL football player
 Gerald Wilkins, NBA player for the New York Knicks, Cleveland Cavaliers, Vancouver Grizzlies, and Orlando Magic
 DeAngelo Yancey, wide receiver for the New York Guardians

References

Further reading
 Randal Maurice Jelks, Benjamin Elijah Mays: Schoolmaster of the Movement: A Biography. Chapel Hill, NC: University of North Carolina Press, 2012.
 Benjamin Elijah Mays, Born to Rebel: An Autobiography. New York: Scribners, 1971.

Mays
Educational institutions established in 1981
1981 establishments in Georgia (U.S. state)